Roll It Over may refer to:

"Roll It Over", a song by Derek and the Dominos, 1970
"Roll It Over" (Oasis song), 2000